Helena West Side is a census-designated place (CDP) in Lewis and Clark County, Montana, United States. The population was 1,637 at the 2010 census, down from 1,711 at the 2000 census due to annexation of part of the CDP by the city of Helena. It is part of the Helena Micropolitan Statistical Area.

Geography
Helena West Side is located in southern Lewis and Clark County at  (46.601782, -112.075860). It is bordered to the east by the city of Helena and to the northeast by the Helena Valley West Central CDP. U.S. Route 12 runs through the community, leading east  to downtown Helena and west over the Continental Divide  to Interstate 90 at Garrison.

The center of the CDP, along US 12, is in the valley of Tenmile Creek, which rises at the Continental Divide and flows northeast into the Helena Valley and the Missouri River.

Demographics

As of the census of 2000, there were 1,711 people, 725 households, and 480 families residing in the CDP. The population density was 116.1 people per square mile (44.8/km2). There were 768 housing units at an average density of 52.1/sq mi (20.1/km2). The racial makeup of the CDP was 95.03% White, 0.12% African American, 1.58% Native American, 0.35% Asian, 0.47% from other races, and 2.45% from two or more races. Hispanic or Latino of any race were 1.46% of the population.

There were 725 households, out of which 30.5% had children under the age of 18 living with them, 52.1% were married couples living together, 9.1% had a female householder with no husband present, and 33.7% were non-families. 28.7% of all households were made up of individuals, and 9.2% had someone living alone who was 65 years of age or older. The average household size was 2.35 and the average family size was 2.87.

In the CDP, the population was spread out, with 25.0% under the age of 18, 6.5% from 18 to 24, 27.9% from 25 to 44, 27.1% from 45 to 64, and 13.5% who were 65 years of age or older. The median age was 39 years. For every 100 females, there were 102.0 males. For every 100 females age 18 and over, there were 102.5 males.

The median income for a household in the CDP was $35,655, and the median income for a family was $44,554. Males had a median income of $30,724 versus $26,827 for females. The per capita income for the CDP was $18,299. About 7.1% of families and 10.0% of the population were below the poverty line, including 10.7% of those under age 18 and 7.1% of those age 65 or over.

Population Change 
Population in 2010: 1,637. Population change since 2000: -4.3%. Males 870 (53.2%) and Females 767 (46.8%).

Zip codes: 59636.

References

Census-designated places in Lewis and Clark County, Montana
Census-designated places in Montana
Helena, Montana micropolitan area